Ronan Flood has been the caddie of professional golfer Pádraig Harrington since 2004.  He is a former assistant bank manager for AIB and played to a two handicap. He and Harrington have been close friends since childhood and are married to sisters Caroline and Suzie Gregan.

References

Caddies
Living people
Year of birth missing (living people)